Manfred Schmid (born 20 February 1971) is an Austrian football coach and a former player.

Playing career
Schmid played for Austria Wien from 1989 to 2002 and LASK Linz from 2002 to 2003.

Coaching career
Schmid was the assistant coach for the reserve team of Austria Wien in the 2007–08 season. However, during the winter break, he took over as head coach of  Schwanenstadt 08 and was there until the end of the season. After his coaching stint at Schwanenstadt 08, he became assistant coach at Wiener Neustadt. He left Wiener Neustadt to return to Austria Wien where he became assistant coach to the first team. He became assistant coach of 1. FC Köln after the 2012–13 season. He has had talks with Austria Wien about the vacant head coach's job. However, Köln refused to release him.

He was named the head coach of Köln on 9 November 2019 but never managed a game and Markus Gisdol took over nine days later.

Coaching record

References

1971 births
Living people
Austrian footballers
Association football midfielders
FK Austria Wien players
LASK players
Austrian football managers
FK Austria Wien managers
Austrian Football Bundesliga managers
Footballers from Vienna